Ireland competed at the 2009 World Championships in Athletics from 15 to 23 August 2009. A team of 14 athletes was announced in preparation for the competition. Selected athletes achieved one of the competition's qualifying standards. The team included European medallists Derval O'Rourke and David Gillick, and 2008 Olympic finalists Eileen O'Keeffe, Rob Heffernan and Roisin McGettigan.

Team selection

Track and road events

Field and combined events

Results

Men
Track and road events

Women
Track and road events

Field and combined events

References

External links
Official competition website

Nations at the 2009 World Championships in Athletics
Athletics
2009